Hope Jensen Leichter is an American educationalist. She serves as the Elbenwood Professor of Education at Teachers College, Columbia University.

She earned a bachelor's of arts degree from Oberlin College and completed her doctorate at Harvard University. Leichter has been a member of the National Academy of Education since 1979, and was awarded a Guggenheim Fellowship in 1981. She began her career working with the Russell Sage Foundation.

References

Teachers College, Columbia University faculty
Oberlin College alumni
Harvard University alumni
Living people
Year of birth missing (living people)